The Capture of Portobello was a military event during the Anglo–Spanish War in which an English expedition under the command of William Parker assaulted and took Portobello from the Spanish, acquired some booty, and then sacked the place.

Capture

Background
The war with Spain was continuing and English privateers were still roaming the Spanish American empire for prizes and attacking ports. In November 1600 English privateer William Parker sailed from Plymouth, England in command of a modest venture consisting of the 100-ton Prudence, the 60-ton Pearl commanded by Robert Rawlins, a pinnace, and two shallops with crew in all numbering 200 men. At Cubagua they were offered a ransom in exchange for a number of pearl boats they had seized. Near Cabo de le Veda they captured a Portuguese slaving ship. Parker next guided what was now a flotilla of 6 ships to the east of a recently abandoned Nombre de Dios and approached Portobello in pinnaces and shallops with the help of the black guides.

Assault
Under cover of darkness early in the morning of 6 February they employed a captured Portuguese to respond to a challenge from the newly completed fort of San Felipe on the North shore and after succeeding in this ruse were able to bypass the place without hindrance.

They then disembarked a vanguard of some forty men from the shallops. Parker and his men were then able to enter the city on the south shore unopposed since the castle of Santiago de la Gloria was positioned too far away to offer any protection. Whilst some of their party created as much noise and panic as possible in their attack on the barracks and crown buildings the remainder of the English took control of the harbour.

The 100 Spanish defenders which the Spanish Governor Pedro Meléndez had sent were too little too late. There was a bitter battle fought to seize the treasure house but it was captured after some forty Spaniards were surrounded, all being either killed or captured. The English were able to push the rest of the Spanish troops with ease inland and with only a few casualties. By the end of the day however Parker had secured the town and set about garrisoning the place. About 30 Spanish prisoners were taken among whom was the governor and several persons of importance. The English prepared for a Spanish counterattack but it never came.

Aftermath
Parker could only hold the town for 24 hours and the next day found no large bullion shipments. He did however acquire a large haul of booty and he had taken a further three prizes when the harbor was secured. Parker then went about sacking the town and he burnt the suburb of Triana to the ground. After this and with all the booty that could be collected along with cannons, Parker then withdrew releasing the prisoners.

The English then stood out to sea with a total 10,000 ducats of booty. Parker set sail for England. Parker then returned to Plymouth in May 1601 where he distributed his prize money and in September of that year became Mayor. He would then become a founding member of the Virginia Company in 1606.

References

Sources
 
 
 
 
 

Portobello (1601)
Colonial Panama
Portobello
1601 in Central America
17th century in Central America
1601 in the Spanish Empire
1601 in the British Empire